Cymothoe althea, the western glider, is a butterfly in the family Nymphalidae. It is found in Guinea, Sierra Leone, Liberia, Ivory Coast, Ghana and Nigeria. The habitat consists of wetter forests.

Subspecies
Cymothoe althea althea (Guinea, Sierra Leone, Liberia, Ivory Coast, Ghana)
Cymothoe althea bobi Collins & Larsen, 2000 (eastern Nigeria)

References

Butterflies described in 1776
Cymothoe (butterfly)
Taxa named by Pieter Cramer